Air Force Housing, Khuzestan ( – Manāzel Nīrūy Havāyī) is a village and military housing in Jarahi Rural District, in the Central District of Mahshahr County, Khuzestan Province, Iran. At the 2006 census, its population was 117, in 42 families.

References 

Populated places in Mahshahr County